What Happened to the La Las is the tenth studio album by the American rock band moe. It was released on January 24, 2012.

As per usual, most of the songs on this album were road-tested prior to being recorded. "The Bones Of Lazarus" is a reworking of an earlier live favorite, simply called "Lazarus." The composition was renamed in recognition of the 2012 novel, The Bones of Lazarus. Two of the songs - "Chromatic Nightmare" and "Suck A Lemon" - were originally conceived for a themed 2010 performance known as "The Electric Lemoe.nade Acid Test". Although "Haze" was written and originally sung by guitarist Al Schnier, the mic was handed over to bassist Rob Derhak for this album version, and he has handled the vocals on most versions performed since.

A deluxe edition of the album was released with a second disc containing acoustic versions of all the songs.

Track listing 
"The Bones of Lazarus" (Rob Derhak) – 3:56
"Haze" (Al Schnier) – 5:12
"Downward Facing Dog" (Schnier) – 7:54
"Rainshine" (Schnier) – 4:39
"Smoke" (Schnier) – 3:39
"Paper Dragon" (Derhak) – 4:48
"Chromatic Nightmare" (Jim Loughlin) – 3:43
"Puebla" (Schnier) – 4:10
"One Way Traffic" (Derhak) – 2:54
"Suck a Lemon" (Chuck Garvey) – 4:30

Personnel 
Rob Derhak – lead vocals, bass guitar
Al Schnier – lead vocals, guitar, keyboards, mandolin
Chuck Garvey – lead vocals, guitar
Vinnie Amico – drums
Jim Loughlin – percussion, MalletKat, DrumKat, timpani, Rhodes on "Downward Facing Dog"

References

2012 albums
Moe (band) albums